was a feudal domain under the Tokugawa shogunate of Edo period Japan, in what is now northern Okayama Prefecture. It was ruled in its early history by a branch of the Mori clan, and later by a branch of the Matsudaira clan. Tsuyama Domain was dissolved in the abolition of the han system in 1871 and is now part of Okayama Prefecture.

History
In 1600, after the Battle of Sekigahara,  Mimasaka Province was ruled by Kobayakawa Hideaki, the daimyō of Okayama Domain. However, his domain was abolished due to attainder on his death without heir in 1602. In 1603, the Tokugawa shogunate appointed Mori Tadamasa, the son of Mori Yoshinari of Kawanakajima Domain in Shinano Province and the younger brother of Oda Nobunaga's page Mori Ranmaru, to the newly-created Tsuyama Domain with a kokudaka of 186,000 koku. He changed the name of the area, which was originally called  to "Tsuyama", began construction of Tsuyama Castle in 1604 and completed the layout of his castle town by 1616. In 1697, his 5th generation successor Mori Sugutoshi went insane in Ise Province on his way to Edo to fulfill his sankin kōtai duties. The "madness" may have been an excuse, as Sugutoshi had been in charge of constructing dog kennels outside Edo as part of Shogun Tokugawa Tsunayoshi's highly unpopular and ridiculed law against cruelty to animal and Sugutoshi reportedly fell into a rage on hearing that a ronin had broke into the kennel, slaughtering many dogs, which had resulted in the shogunate ordering the execution of a number of his retainers for negligence. 

The domain was reduced to 100,000 koku, and transferred to a branch of the Echizen-Matsudaira clan whose ancestor was Yūki Hideyasu. In 1721, the second daimyō, Matsudaira Asagoro died at the age of 11 without heir. The shogunate agreed to allow a younger son of the daimyō of Shirakawa Nitta Domain to be posthumously adopted to secure the succession, but the kokudaka of the domain was halved to 50,000 koku. The prestige and also the ability of the domain to support its retainers was thus severely restricted, and the domain thereafter suffered from political and economic instability and frequent peasant uprisings. In 1765, the 5th daimyō, Matsudaira Yasuchika, opened a han school, the Kakuzankan (鶴山館), which lasted into the early Meiji period.  The domain managed to restore its status to 100,000 koku when the 7th daimyō, Matsudaira Naritaka, adopted the 14th son of Shogun Tokugawa Ienari as his heir.Matsudaira Naritami was very active in the affairs of the Tokugawa family after 1868. Naritami was also known as Matsudaira Kakudō. 

In the Bakumatsu period, the domain produced a number of doctors and rangaku scholars, including diplomat and legal scholar Tsuda Mamichi and future Prime Minister Hiranuma Kiichiro.  In 1871 ,the domain became Tsuyama Prefecture due to the abolition of the han system. It was later incorporated into Okayama Prefecture via Hōjō Prefecture.

Holdings at the end of the Edo period
As with most domains in the han system, Tsuyama Domain consisted of several discontinuous territories calculated to provide the assigned kokudaka, based on periodic cadastral surveys and projected agricultural yields, g. 

Mimasaka Province 
22 villages in Higashinanjō District
3 villages in Aida District
7 villages in Yoshino District
45 villages in Shōnan District
10 villages in Katsuhoku District
26 villages in Nishisaijō District
25 villages in Nishihōjō District
25 villages in Tohokujō District
10 villages in Kumehōjō District
32 villages in Oba District

Sanuki Province 
6 villages in Shōzu District
3 villages in Aida District

In addition to the above, Tsuyama was in charge of administration of tenryō territories in Mimasaka: 7 villages in Tohokujō District, 27 villages in Oba District, and 32 villages in Saijō District.

List of daimyō 

{| class=wikitable
! #||Name || Tenure || Courtesy title || Court Rank || kokudaka
|-
|colspan=6|  Mori clan, 1603-1697 (Tozama)
|-
||1||||1603 - 1634||Sakon'e-gon-chūjō (左近衛権中将)|| Junior 4th Rank, Upper Grade (従四位上)||186,500 koku 
|-
||2||||1634 - 1674||Dainaiki (大内記)|| Junior 4th Rank, Lower Grade (従四位下)||186,500 koku 
|-
||3||||1674 - 1686||Hoki-no-kami (伯耆守)|| Junior 4th Rank, Lower Grade (従四位下)||186,500 koku 
|-
||4||||1686 - 1697||Mimasaka-no-kami (美作守); Jijū (侍従)|| Junior 4th Rank, Lower Grade (従四位下)||186,500 koku 
|-
||5||||1697 - 1697||-none-|| -none-||186,500 koku 
|-

|colspan=6|  Echizen-Matsudaira clan, 1698-1871 (Shinpan)
|-
||1||||1698 - 1721||Bizen-no-kami (備前守)|| Junior 4th Rank, Lower Grade (従四位下)||100,000 koku 
|-
||2||||1721 - 1726|| - none - || - none -|| 100,000 koku 
|-
||3||||1726 - 1735||Echigo-no-kami (越後守)|| Junior 4th Rank, Lower Grade (従四位下)||50,000 koku 
|-
||4||||1735 - 1762||Echigo-no-kami (越後守); Jijū (侍従)|| Junior 4th Rank, Lower Grade (従四位下)||50,000 koku 
|-
||5||||1762 - 1794||Echigo-no-kami (越後守); Jijū (侍従)|| Junior 4th Rank, Lower Grade (従四位下)||50,000 koku 
|-
||6||||1794 - 1805||Echigo-no-kami (越後守)|| Junior 4th Rank, Lower Grade (従四位下)||50,000 koku 
|-
||7||||1805 - 1831||Sakon'e-chūjō (左近衛中将)|| Junior 4th Rank, Upper Grade (従四位上)||50,000 -> 100,000 koku 
|-
||8||||1831 - 1855||Echigo-no-kami (越後守); Sakon'e-no-chūshō (左近衛中将)|| Senior 4th Rank, Upper Grade (正四位上)||100,000 koku 
|-
||9||||1855 - 1871||Echigo-no-kami (越後守); Sakon'e-no-chūshō (左近衛中将)||  Senior 4th Rank, Lower Grade (正四位下)||100,000 koku 
|- 
|-
|}

Simplified genealogy (Matsudaira)

 Tokugawa Ieyasu, 1st Tokugawa shōgun (1543–1616; r. 1603–1605)
Yūki (Matsudaira) Hideyasu, 1st daimyō of Fukui (1574–1607)
Naomoto, Lord of Himeji (1604–1648)
 Naonori, daimyō of Shirakawa (1642–1695)
 I. Nobutomi, 1st daimyō of Tsuyama (cr. 1698) (1680–1721; daimyō of Tsuyama: 1698–1721)
  II. Asagorō, 2nd daimyō of Tsuyama (1716–1726; r. 1721–1726)
 Chikakiyo, daimyō of Shirakawa (1682–1721)
  III. Nagahiro, 3rd daimyō of Tsuyama (1720–1735; r. 1726–1735)
 Naomasa, 1st daimyō of Matsue (1601–1666)
 Chikayoshi, 1st daimyō of Hirose (1632–1717)
 Chikatoki, 2nd daimyō of Hirose (1659–1702)
 Chikatomo, 3rd daimyō of Hirose (1681–1728)
  IV. Nagataka, 4th daimyō of Tsuyama (1725–1762; r. 1735–1762)
  V. Yasuchika, 5th daimyō of Tsuyama (1752–1794; r. 1762–1794)
 VI. Yasuharu, 6th daimyō of Tsuyama (1786–1805; r. 1794–1805)
  VII. Naritaka, 7th daimyō of Tsuyama (1788–1838; r. 1805–1831)
  IX. Yoshitomi, 9th daimyō of Tsuyama (1827–1871; Lord: 1855–1869; Governor: 1869–1871)
 Tokugawa Yorinobu, 1st daimyō of Kishū (1602–1671)
 Tokugawa Mitsusada, 2nd daimyō of Kishū (1627–1705)
 Tokugawa Yoshimune, 8th Tokugawa shōgun (1684–1751; 5th Lord of Kishū: 1705–1716; 8th Tokugawa shōgun: 1716–1745)
 Tokugawa Munetada, 1st Hitotsubashi-Tokugawa family head (1721–1765)
 Tokugawa Harusada, 2nd Hitotsubashi-Tokugawa family head (1751–1827)
  Tokugawa Ienari, 11th Tokugawa shōgun (1773–1841; r. 1786–1837)
  VIII. Matsudaira Naritami, 8th daimyō of Tsuyama (1814–1891; r. 1831–1855)

See also

 List of Han
 Abolition of the han system

References 

Domains of Japan
History of Okayama Prefecture
Mimasaka Province
Chūgoku region
Matsudaira clan
1600 establishments in Japan
States and territories established in 1600
1871 disestablishments in Japan
States and territories disestablished in 1871